Mohammad Omar Shishani (born April 24, 1989) is a Jordanian football player who plays as a striker for Al-Faisaly.

International career statistics

References

External links 
 kooora.com
 
 

1989 births
Living people
Jordanian footballers
Jordan international footballers
Association football forwards
Footballers at the 2010 Asian Games
Sportspeople from Amman
Al-Faisaly SC players
Shabab Al-Ordon Club players
Al-Hussein SC (Irbid) players
Al-Ramtha SC players
Al-Baqa'a Club players
Al-Ahli SC (Amman) players
Asian Games competitors for Jordan
Jordanian people of Chechen descent